Fritton and St Olaves is a civil parish in the English county of Norfolk. The parish comprises the villages of Fritton and St. Olaves, together with the surrounding rural area.

For the purposes of local government, the parish today falls within the district of Great Yarmouth. Prior to the 1974 reorganisation of counties in England the entire area of the parish was part of the Lothingland Rural District of Suffolk, with the St Olaves portion of the parish of Herringfleet and Fritton as a separate parish.

References

External links

Borough of Great Yarmouth
Civil parishes in Norfolk